Senatorial courtesy is an unwritten rule practiced in the Senate of the U.S. state of New Jersey under which a State Senator can indefinitely block consideration of a nomination by the Governor of New Jersey for a gubernatorial nominee from the Senator's home county, without being required to provide an explanation. While the practice is infrequently invoked, it has brought calls for legislation that would forbid its use.

Following the 1973 Democratic landslide, where Democrats won a 29–10 majority (with one independent), the newly elected Senate Democratic leadership—Senate President Frank J. Dodd (D-West Orange) and Majority Leader Matthew Feldman (D-Teaneck) moved to eliminate the Caucus System and Senatorial courtesy rules.  The caucus system rule ended for good, but a faction of the Democratic majority led by Senator James P. Dugan (D-Jersey City), the incumbent Democratic State Chairman, teamed with Republican Senators to continue the practice of Senatorial courtesy. In a ruling issued on December 23, 1993, the New Jersey Supreme Court upheld the use of senatorial courtesy, despite the fact that it is an unwritten rule. The vote in the Supreme Court had been 3–3, with Chief Justice Robert Wilentz recusing himself because he had made a statement that opposed its use in the case of Judge Murphy.

In a 2014 opinion piece published in The Record, State Senator Kevin J. O'Toole (R-Essex) wrote: "Over the span of six decades, it has morphed into a tool sometimes used as a bargaining chip in bitter partisan battles." O'Toole has called for reform of the practice, saying: "Ultimately, the political desires of 40 members of the Senate should not outweigh the needs of 8 million New Jerseyans."

Examples
 The renomination of New Jersey Attorney General Grover C. Richman was blocked in 1958 by State Senator Albert McCay (R-Burlington).  Despite sharp criticism from Governor Robert B. Meyner, McCay held firm and the Senate backed him up.  Richman withdrew his name from consideration.
 The nomination of Ned Parsekian as Director of the Motor Vehicles was blocked in 1959 by Senator Walter H. Jones.  He served as Acting Director for three years, until Pierce H. Deamer, Jr., Jones' successor and political rival, consented to the nomination.  Governor Richard J. Hughes nominated Parsekian to the New Jersey Superior Court in 1964, but Deamer refused to sign off and the nomination was withdrawn.
 The nomination of Joel Jacobson, the state Energy Commissioner and a former labor leader, to the New Jersey Casino Control Commission in 1981, was blocked by Senator James Wallwork (R-Essex). Governor Brendan Byrne orchestrated an end-run around Senatorial Courtesy and Jacobson moved from Essex County to Ocean County, where Senator John F. Russo (D-Ocean) signed off, allowing Jacobson to be confirmed by the Democratic-controlled Senate.
 The renomination of Superior Court Judge Sylvia Pressler in 1983 was blocked by Senator Gerald Cardinale (R-Bergen), who disagreed with many of her judicial rulings during the previous seven years.  State Senator Gerald Cardinale attempted to block her reappointment to the Superior Court by invoking senatorial courtesy. Senate President Carmen A. Orechio removed Cardinale's ability to block her nomination, citing the fact that he had previously appeared before Judge Pressler in a legal matter, and her nomination was approved.
 The renomination of Superior Court Judge Marianne Espinosa Murphy, then the wife of Morris County Prosecutor Michael Murphy and the daughter-in-law of former Governor and Chief Justice Richard J. Hughes, was blocked in 1993 by Senate Majority Leader John H. Dorsey (R-Boonton).  Despite endorsements from the New Jersey State Bar Association and advocacy groups for custodial parents, Dorsey indicated that he had received complaints that she "giggles and throws pencils on the desk during testimony". This created a controversy.  Dorsey eventually relented to some degree and stated that he would agree to allow Judge Murphy to be appointed to a new, untenured seven-year term.  Judge Murphy declined on the grounds that the process of refusing her an untenured term without a hearing in the Senate posed a threat to judicial independence. Dorsey's use of Senatorial courtesy was the impetus behind a challenge in the 1993 Republican State Senate primary by a politically unknown lawyer, Chris Christie; Christie's campaign ended when his nominating petitions were invalidated for not having enough signatures. After Dorsey's defeat, Senate President Donald DiFrancesco (R-Union) amended the unwritten Senatorial Courtesy rule so as not to apply to any sitting Judge who was renominated by the Governor.
Senator Anthony Bucco of Morris County used senatorial courtesy in 2004 to block four nominations to the Highlands Commission until he could have an opportunity to meet with Bradley M. Campbell, commissioner of the New Jersey Department of Environmental Protection. Bucco sought to register his concern about how the Highlands Water Protection and Planning Act would limit development in the New Jersey Highlands, and dropped his block after Campbell met with Bucco, Senator Guy R. Gregg and the mayors of several municipalities in Morris County, with Bucco saying "All I wanted was my day in court".
In 2006, Nia Gill of Essex County threatened to use senatorial courtesy to block a broad range of nominees from her home county as a way to gain leverage to reach a compromise on a needle exchange program aimed at controlling the spread of HIV. In June 2007, Gill staged a week-long protest under which she invoked senatorial courtesy to block the consideration of Jon Corzine's nomination of Stuart Rabner as chief justice of the New Jersey Supreme Court. Rabner's nomination had been considered likely, but hearings that had been scheduled by the Senate Judiciary Committee to consider Rabner were postponed as Gill would not sign off on the nomination.

See also
Senatorial courtesy - Implementation on a national level
Caucus System

References

Government of New Jersey
New Jersey Legislature
Parliamentary procedure